{{Infobox road
|state=ME
|type=ME
|route=115
|map=
|map_custom=yes
|length_mi=18.02
|length_ref=
|established=
|direction_a=West
|terminus_a= in North Windham
|junction={{plainlist|
 at Windham/Gray town line<ref name="delorme">DeLorme Mapping Company 'The Maine Atlas and Gazetteer'' 13th Edition (1988)  map 5</ref>
 in Gray
 in Gray
 in North Yarmouth
 in North Yarmouth
}}
|direction_b=East
|terminus_b= in Yarmouth
|counties= Cumberland
|previous_type=ME
|previous_route=114
|next_type=ME
|next_route=116
}}State Route 115 (SR 115''') is a  state highway in southern Maine, United States.

Route description

SR 115 serves as the primary entrance to North Windham village from the east.  Within North Windham, it crosses a bridge over Ditch Brook marking the location of a terminal moraine formerly containing Little Sebago Lake until destroyed by a flood on June 4, 1814.  SR 115 becomes concurrent with US 202/SR 4 at the Gray town line and parallels the west bank of the Pleasant River through West Gray until reaching Gray village after an interchange with Interstate 95 (I-95) / Maine Turnpike. SR 115 separates from US 202 as the easterly road of the five-way intersection at Gray village and proceeds southeasterly paralleling the west bank of the Royal River through Walnut Hill in North Yarmouth, where it is known as Gray Road. SR 115 is known as West Main Street as it enters the town of Yarmouth, crossing the Maine Central Railroad Back Road and Lower Road a short distance northeast of their separation at Royal Junction.

Major intersections

References

External links

Floodgap Roadgap's RoadsAroundME: Maine State Route 115

115
Transportation in Cumberland County, Maine